The Motocross des Nations (in French) is an annual team motocross race, where riders representing their country meet at what is billed as the "Olympics of Motocross". The event has been staged since 1947, where the team of Bill Nicholson, Fred Rist and Bob Ray, representing Great Britain, took home the Chamberlain Trophy for the first time.

The event as it stands today is an amalgamation of three separate events, the original Motocross des Nations, raced with 500cc motorcycles, the Trophée des Nations, raced with 250cc motorcycles, and the Coupe des Nations, for 125cc motorcycles. Before 1984, the three events were held in different locations on different weekends, whereafter they were combined into a single event with one rider per class.

The scoring for the event works on the position system, i.e. first place is awarded one point, second place two, etc. Each class (currently MXGP, MX2 and Open) races twice, each time against one of other two classes, for a total of three races. The worst score of three races is dropped, and the lowest combined score wins.

The event's name has been officially anglicised (as Motocross of Nations "MXON") since 2004, when Youthstream was awarded promotional rights for the World Motocross Grand Prix, although the general moniker Des Nations or MXDN is still very much in use. Races are streamed live on the MXGP website.

Historically Great Britain dominated the early years, before the competition became more fierce. With the rise of motocross in North America from the 1970s, the USA embarked on a famous winning streak, lasting 13 years from 1981 to 1993.

Motocross des Nations winners

Participating nations 2000–2022

Participating nations pre-2000

Participating nations: 500cc-only era

Trophée des Nations winners

References

External links
 Monster Energy FIM Motocross of Nations, official website 
 Teams for the 2015 MXoN
 News on change of 2017 MXoN venue from Glen Helen to Matterley Basin

 
Motocross
World motorcycle racing series